Robert Levin may refer to:

Robert Levin (musicologist) (born 1947), American pianist and composer
Robert Levin (Norwegian pianist) (1912–1996), Norwegian pianist and composer
Robert Levin (writer) (born 1939), American fiction writer
Rob Levin (1955–2006), also known as lilo, founder of freenode
Bobby Levin (born 1957), American bridge player

See also 
Robert Levine (disambiguation)